This is a list of bridges and other crossings of the Pasig River in Metro Manila, Philippines.

The crossings are listed in order starting from its mouth at Manila Bay and proceeding upstream to its source at Laguna de Bay.

Skyway is the first and only tollway bridge crosses the river.

The planned Metro Manila Subway will also cross the Pasig River between Pasig and Makati, making it the first tunnel to cross the river and the proposed MRT Line 10 is the fourth rail bridge parallel to the existing Bagong Ilog Bridge of C-5.

Current crossings
These are arranged from the mouth at Manila Bay to the source, from Laguna de Bay.

Former crossings 
These are arranged from oldest to newest.

Planned crossings
These are arranged from the mouth to the source.

References

Pasig
Crossings
Bridges in Metro Manila
Crossings
Crossings
Lists of river crossings